C60, C.60, or C-60 may refer to:

Vehicles and transport 
 Caudron C.60, a 1920s French two-seat biplane
 Chevrolet C-60, a medium-duty truck
 Lockheed C-60 Lodestar a WW2-era transport airplane
 JNR Class C60, a Japanese class of steam locomotives
 Autovia C-60, a highway in Catalonia, Spain

Science 
 Buckminsterfullerene, a carbon molecule with the chemical formula C60, also known as a buckyball
 Caldwell 60, one of the Antennae Galaxies in the constellation Corvus
 Corydoras osteocarus, a freshwater catfish
 Carcinoma of the penis ICD-10 code
A kind of carbon called carbon fibre

Other uses 
 AMD C-60 (formerly AMD Fusion C-60), a computer processor by AMD, codename "Ontario"
 Bill C-60, a proposed Canadian law
 C60 (band), a band also known as Cobalt 60
 A 60-minute audio Compact Cassette tape
 Ruy Lopez chess openings ECO code